Eptalofosuchus is a genus of Notosuchian from the Uberaba Formation in Brazil, and contains one species, E. viridi.

Description 
The genus was described on the basis of a fragmentary mandible, which was found in the Uberaba Formation in the Bauru Group, of southeastern Brazil, which was said to be from an advanced Notosuchian.

References 

Notosuchians
Prehistoric reptile genera
Fossil taxa described in 2021